A papasan chair (also called a bowl chair or moon chair) is a type of bowl-shaped chair.

Design 

A papasan chair is a large rounded bowl-shaped chair with an adjustable angle. The bowl rests in an upright frame traditionally made of rattan, but also sometimes made of sturdy wicker or wood.

The base frame often has rings of two different diameters, with the larger intended to be upright, to better support the bowl, and the smaller ring intended to be placed on the floor. This orientation is often mistakenly reversed, resulting in less stability for the upper chair.

The cushion of the chair is typically thick velveteen material filled with cotton fluff similar to that of a futon. In traditional papasans, the cushion can be removed and used outside of the sturdy frame.

Papasan chairs are typically 35–60 inches wide and 35 inches deep.

History 
The papasan chair gained popularity in the west when American World War II veterans brought them home from Asia, where they had been used in the Philippines and Japan for centuries.

Types 
The mamasan chair is a double-seating version, and was introduced to the western world in the 1950s. Prior to that, it was in use in far eastern Asia, particularly in Indonesia, Thailand, and Japan. It can also be called a double papasan chair, which term is widely used.

References

Further reading 
 

Chairs
1970s fads and trends